Mario Fatafehi (born January 27, 1979) is a former American football defensive tackle. He was drafted in the fifth round of the 2001 NFL Draft. His professional career involved stints with the Arizona Cardinals, the Carolina Panthers and the Denver Broncos of the NFL and the Hamilton Tiger-Cats of the Canadian Football League.

Fatafehi played college football at Kansas State University. Fatafehi started 24 consecutive games at defensive tackle for Kansas State University and registered 128 tackles and 12 sacks after transferring from Snow College; he posted 80 tackles and 8.5 sacks as a senior at Kansas State to earn first-team All-Big 12 Conference honors; as a junior, he picked up Big 12 Defensive Newcomer-of-the-Year honours as well as second-team all-conference accolades. Fatafehi was a first-team junior college All-American at Snow College, where he was the team's defensive captain and most valuable player as a two-year starter.

Prior to attending Kansas State he played at Snow College and graduated from Farrington High School in Honolulu. His older brother Toni attended Foothill College and later the University of Utah.

References

External links
Just Sports Stats
Honolulu Star Bulletin article

1979 births
American football defensive tackles
American people of Tongan descent
American players of Canadian football
Arizona Cardinals players
Canadian football defensive linemen
Carolina Panthers players
Denver Broncos players
Hamilton Tiger-Cats players
Kansas State Wildcats football players
Living people
Players of American football from Chicago
Players of Canadian football from Chicago
Snow Badgers football players